Choa Chu Kang Park is a community park in Singapore located beside Kranji Expressway and along Choa Chu Kang Drive.

See also
List of parks in Singapore

External links
National Parks Board, Singapore
Choa Chu Kang Park

Parks in Singapore
Choa Chu Kang